The Algoma Central Corporation is the result of a reorganization of the Algoma Central Railway in 1990. The company claims assets in excess of $400 million and revenue of $280 million. Corporate headquarters is located in St. Catharines, Ontario, Canada.

Subsidiaries
The company operates a number of subsidiaries including:

 Algoma Central Properties - owning commercial real estate in Sault Ste. Marie, St. Catharines, and Waterloo, Ontario
 Algoma Ship Repair - repairs ships at its dock on the Welland Canal in Port Colborne, Ontario
 Algoma Tankers - transportation of petroleum products through the Great Lakes
 Algoma Central Marine - operates bulk shipping on the Great Lakes (see below)
 Formerly Algoma Central Railway

In 1980, the Algoma Central was the original owner (as Algocen Realty Holdings Ltd.) of Algo Centre Mall; Algoma Central Company wrote off over $5 million in property value due to 1990's Elliot Lake mine closures and subsequently sold the property. The mall, renamed in 2005 by a subsequent owner, collapsed in a June 23, 2012, structural failure and has since been demolished.

Shipping

An Algoma Central Corp. subsidiary, Algoma Central Marine, operates a fleet of self unloaders on the Great Lakes.

In 2000, Upper Lakes Shipping Ltd. and Algoma Central began a partnership to coordinate the transportation of goods along the St. Lawrence Seaway, called Seaway Marine Transport.

In 2011 upon the purchase of Upper Lakes Shipping Ltd. and buying out the partnership, the company re-emerged as Algoma Central Marine.  Upon completion of the purchase, the entire fleet was then renamed, with the exception of the John D. Leitch, the ship that was named in honor of the company's then owner.

Beginning in 2013, the corporation initiated construction of a series of new bulk carriers to be named after the lead ship, . The redesigned fleet incorporated engineering and technology improvements to reduce fuel consumption, create a safer workplace, and reduce emissions and other environmental impact. The company installed Buffalo Automation's AutoMate system of sensors, cameras, and software on select Equinox series vessels, to evaluate autonomous navigation.

Algoma also owns several gearless bulk carriers:

Algoma operates a fleet of tankers:

References

External links
Algoma Central Corporation

Companies listed on the Toronto Stock Exchange
Companies based in St. Catharines
Canadian companies established in 1990
Shipping companies of Canada
 
1990 establishments in Ontario
Great Lakes Shipping Companies